Albert Halls may refer to:
 The Albert Halls, Stirling
 The Albert Halls, Bolton

Not to be confused with the Royal Albert Hall in London.